Yeguada may refer to:

Places
Yeguada, Camuy, Puerto Rico, a barrio
Yeguada, Vega Baja, Puerto Rico, a barrio